Hongjie Dai (born 2 May 1966 in Shaoyang, China) is a Chinese-American nanotechnologist and applied physicist. He is the J.G. Jackson & C.J. Wood Professor of Chemistry at Stanford University. A leading figure in the study of carbon nanotubes, Dai is ranked as one of the top chemists in the world by Science Watch. He is currently the scientific advisor and co-founder to Nirmidas Biotech, Inc., which aims to commercialize his breakthrough research on NIR-II dyes and plasmonic gold (pGOLD) to applications in healthcare and in vitro diagnostics.

Dai received a B.S. in Physics from Tsinghua University in 1989, then went to the United States through the CUSPEA program organized by Prof. T. D. Lee. He finished a M.S. in Applied Sciences from Columbia University in 1991, and a PhD in Applied Physics from Harvard University in 1994 under the direction of Prof. Charles Lieber. After postdoctoral research at Harvard, he joined the Stanford faculty as an assistant professor in 1997.

Among his awards are the American Chemical Society's ACS Award in pure chemistry, 2002, the Julius Springer Prize for Applied Physics, 2004, and the American Physical Society's James C. McGroddy Prize for New Materials, 2006. He was elected to the American Academy of Arts and Sciences in 2009, and to the American Association for the Advancement of Science in 2011. He was elected a member of the National Academy of Sciences in 2016, and in 2019 he was elected a member of the National Academy of Medicine and a foreign member of the Chinese Academy of Sciences.

References

1966 births
Living people
21st-century American physicists
American nanotechnologists
Carbon scientists
American people of Chinese descent
Chemists from Hunan
Chinese nanotechnologists
Columbia School of Engineering and Applied Science alumni
Fellows of the American Academy of Arts and Sciences
Fellows of the American Association for the Advancement of Science
Harvard University alumni
Members of the United States National Academy of Sciences
People from Shaoyang
Physicists from Hunan
Stanford University Department of Chemistry faculty
Tsinghua University alumni
Foreign members of the Chinese Academy of Sciences
Members of the National Academy of Medicine